Columbicella explanata is a species of beetle in the family Cerambycidae, and the only species in the genus Columbicella. It was described by Galileo and Martins in 1990.

References

Hemilophini
Beetles described in 1990